The Eisch is a river flowing through Belgium and Luxembourg, joining the Alzette on its left in Mersch.  It flows through the towns of Eischen, Hobscheid, Septfontaines, and Marienthal.

It has several sources near the villages of Sélange (Belgium) and Clemency (Luxembourg).

The Luxembourgish part of the Eisch is informally known as the 'Valley of the Seven Castles', for the seven castles that line its route.

International rivers of Europe
Belgium–Luxembourg border
Rivers of the Ardennes (Belgium)
Rivers of the Ardennes (Luxembourg)
Rivers of Luxembourg
Rivers of Belgium
Rivers of Luxembourg (Belgium)
Rivers of Mersch